Naprzód Janów is an ice hockey team from the Janów neighbourhood of Katowice, Poland. They compete in the Polska Hokej Liga, the top level of ice hockey in Poland.

History
The team was founded as Górnik Janów in 1920. In 1962, they were renamed their present name, Naprzód Janów. The club ceased to exist in 1998, but returned to the Polish 1. Liga in 2004, as a part amateur team. They won promotion to the PLH in 2006/2007, but were relegated during the 2010/2011 season due to financial troubles. In 2014, they returned to the top level, only to return to the Polish 1. Liga in 2016 after financial difficulties prevented them from playing in the PHL.

Achievements
Polish Cup champion (1): 1970.
Polska Liga Hokejowa runner-up (7): 1950, 1952, 1971, 1973, 1977, 1989, 1992.
Polish 1. Liga champions (3): 1962, 2014, 2017.

External links
 Official website
 Naprzód Janów on hockeyarenas.net

Ice hockey teams in Poland
Sport in Katowice
Ice hockey clubs established in 1950
1950 establishments in Poland